Good Morning Football is a live NFL morning television program on NFL Network. The program premiered on Monday, August 1, 2016. It airs from 7 a.m. to 10 a.m. ET.

The program is hosted by Kyle Brandt, Jamie Erdahl, Jason McCourty and Peter Schrager weekdays, and Colleen Wolfe on weekends. Analysts Michael Robinson and DeAngelo Hall appear throughout the week, rotating as a fill in host on weekdays.  NFL insider Mike Garafolo is featured all throughout the week.

Production
Good Morning Football replaced earlier attempts by NFL Network at a morning television program, including NFL AM and NFL HQ. Unlike its predecessors, which were filmed in Los Angeles, the show is produced live on the east coast. The move was made, in part, because doing the show required the live broadcasts to begin at 4 a.m. Pacific Time. According to chief content officer of NFL Media Jordan Levin, "There’s an energy to morning programming. The challenge is compounded when you have people who are literally doing the show in the middle of the night." The weekday program first utilized the CBS Broadcast Center on West 57th Street as a condition of CBS holding the rights to Thursday Night Football.

Good Morning Football is the first NFL Network program to originate in New York since the network's launch in 2003. Sony Pictures Television's Embassy Row handles production of the show, with CEO Michael Davies as the executive producer.

In May 2018, the weekday program moved from the CBS Broadcast Center to 20 Times Square, inside a studio constructed within the new NFL Experience attraction. With the planned closure of the attraction, the show moved to SportsNet New York's studios at 4 World Trade Center with a new set debuting November 5, 2018. The weekend program is broadcast from NFL Films in Mt. Laurel, New Jersey.

On April 25 and 26, 2019, the program was simulcast by ESPN2 as part of coverage of the 2019 NFL Draft (which would see personalities from ESPN and NFL Network appearing as contributors on each other's studio programs).

References

External links
 
 

National Football League television series
NFL Network original programming
Television morning shows in the United States
American sports television series
English-language television shows
2016 American television series debuts
2010s American television talk shows